The Rutgers Scarlet Knights football team represents Rutgers University in the Football Bowl Subdivision (FBS) of the National Collegiate Athletics Association (NCAA). Rutgers competes as a member of the East Division of the Big Ten Conference. Prior to joining the Big Ten, the Scarlet Knights were a member of the American Athletic Conference (formerly the Big East Conference) from 1991 to 2013. Rutgers plays its home games at SHI Stadium, in Piscataway, New Jersey. The team is currently led by head coach Greg Schiano. The Rutgers Scarlet Knights football team is notable for playing in the first ever intercollegiate football game in 1869, in which the Rutgers Scarlet Knights defeated the Princeton Tigers by a score of 6–4.

History

Early history (1869–1958)

On November 6, 1869, Rutgers University and Princeton University competed in the first ever intercollegiate football game. The site for the contest was a small plot of land where the College Avenue stands on Rutgers' campus in New Brunswick, New Jersey. The structure of the game resembled more of a rugby-style contest in which players were allowed to kick and bat the ball with their fists and hands, instead of modern-day football.  At the time, Rutgers was referred to as the Queensmen, a homage to the school's chartered name of Queen's College. The Rutgers squad was captained by William J. Leggett and donned scarlet kerchiefs atop their heads in an effort to distinguish between the two teams. Rutgers won the contest by a score of 6–4. A week after the first game was held in New Brunswick, Rutgers visited Princeton for a second matchup. This time, Princeton prevailed by a score of 8–0. Rutgers and Princeton had planned for a third game in the 1869 season, but the contest never took place due to fears that the games were interfering with the students' studies. Thus, both schools would end the season with a record of 1–1. From 1929 to 1975, Rutgers was a member of the Middle Three Conference, which consisted of a round-robin against Lafayette College and Lehigh University. J. Wilder Tasker served as the head football coach of the Queensmen football program for seven seasons, from 1931 to 1937. Under his leadership, the Scarlet Knights compiled a record of 31–27–5. Tasker was replaced by Harvey Harman, who led the team from 1938 through the 1940s and into the 1950s (Rutgers did not field a football team from 1942 to 1946 due to World War II). Harman's record at Rutgers is 33–26–1 in a total of 14 seasons. 
Succeeding Tasker was John Stiegman, who compiled a record of 22–15 in four seasons. 
Starting in 1940, the 'conference champion' received the Little Brass Cannon. Following Lehigh's capture of the Little Brass Cannon in 1951, Rutgers became an independent team in 1952, but still played Lafayette and the Middle Three round-robin in 1953.

John Bateman era (1960–1972)
John Bateman succeeded Stiegman and coached the Scarlet Knights for 13 seasons, compiling a record of 73–51. Rutgers compiled records of 8–1 and 9–0 in 1960 and 1961, respectively, as well as an 8–2 campaign in 1968. Although Rutgers continued to be a part of the Middle Three until 1975, Rutgers became a member of the Middle Atlantic Conference from 1958 to 1961. Rutgers won the conference championship in three of those four years (1958, 1960, and 1961) and was awarded the Wilmington Touchdown Club Trophy. The 1961 season was particularly remarkable as it was the Scarlet Knights' first undefeated season (9–0) with Alabama, one of only two undefeated teams in the nation—and the team was captained by future star college football hall-of-famer Alex Kroll. 

In 1961, Rutgers was considered a contender for the Rose Bowl, but was not selected because university president Mason Welch Gross did not express interest with the Rose Bowl's organizers. The following year, Rutgers then again became independent, and then remained so until it joined the Big East Conference in 1991.

Frank Burns era (1973–1983)
Frank Burns was promoted from assistant coach after John Bateman's departure, under Burns, the Scarlet Knights enjoyed eight consecutive winning seasons, which included a 9–2 campaign in 1975 season, and a perfect 11–0 season in 1976, followed by records of 8–3, 9–3, 8–3 and 7–4 seasons in the succeeding years. However with consecutive 5–6 campaigns in 1981 and 1982, and a 3–8 record in 1983, resulted in Frank Burns being dismissed as the head football coach at Rutgers.

In 1976, Rutgers declined an invitation to play an unranked McNeese State University at the inaugural Independence Bowl, feeling snubbed by more prestigious bowls despite its perfect undefeated 11–0 season. 

In 1978, Rutgers appeared in its first bowl game, the Garden State Bowl, which it lost to Arizona State by a score of 34–18.

Dick Anderson era (1984–1989)
Penn State offensive line coach Dick Anderson was hired to replace Burns in 1984. The Scarlet Knights mostly struggled during Dick Anderson's tenure as head coach despite winning records in 1984, 1986 and 1987, which resulted in Anderson's firing after the end of the 1989 season.

Doug Graber era (1990–1995)
Tampa Bay Buccaneers defensive coordinator Doug Graber took over the Rutgers football program starting in 1990. Under Graber's tutelage, the Scarlet Knights achieved winning seasons in 1991 and 1992, but struggled to maintain consistency and, following a 4–7 campaign in 1995, Graber was fired with two years remaining on his original seven-year contract. Rutgers joined the Big East Conference in all sports in 1991. The team struggled to compete throughout the 1990s, facing powerhouse teams from Virginia Tech, Miami, and West Virginia on a yearly basis.

Terry Shea era (1996–2000)
Longtime assistant coach Terry Shea was hired to replace Graber in December 1995, However, the Rutgers program suffered its worst five-year stretch in program history. Shea's tenure not only failed to produce a single winning season, it failed to win more than three games in a single season with the exception of a 5–6 campaign in 1998. After the 2000 season Shea was fired.

Greg Schiano era (2001–2011)
Greg Schiano took over as head coach after Terry Shea's termination. Despite some early recruiting successes, his first four years resulted in losing seasons. In 2005, the team achieved its first winning season since Graber's 7-4 campaign in 1992, which notched them a rematch bowl berth against Arizona State in the 2005 Insight Bowl. In that game, Rutgers lost 45–40 in a shootout, but was led by a 100-yard rushing performance from freshman running back Ray Rice. In 2006, Rutgers started the season with nine straight wins, culminating in a momentous eighteen-point comeback victory at home against the Louisville Cardinals, ranked third at the time, in what became known as the "Pandemonium In Piscataway." Kicker Jeremy Ito sealed the 28-25 win with a late field goal.

The following week, Rutgers got to its highest polling rank in school history, topping out at No. 7 in the AP Poll and No. 6 in the BCS. At year's end, the Scarlet Knights had a record of 11–2 and a postseason rank of No. 12 in the AP Poll, with a victory in the postseason: Rutgers beat Kansas State 37-10 in the Texas Bowl. It was the first bowl win in Rutgers history. The following year, Rutgers received its first ever preseason rank in the AP Poll at No. 16. 2007 was an up-and-down year for the Scarlet Knights, rising into the Top 10 for the second consecutive year, only to suffer back-to-back losses. Highlighted by a 30-27 upset over second ranked South Florida, and ended with an 8-5 record and a 52-30 victory over Ball State in the International Bowl. 2008 saw Rutgers again go 8-5, beginning the year 1-5 with a slow start, before ripping off seven straight victories to finish the season, winning 29-23 in the PapaJohns.com Bowl with a victory over NC State.

In 2009, Rutgers entered the season as the favorite to win the Big East Conference. However, the season opener was a loss to Cincinnati, who would end up with a perfect regular season—and the conference title. Rutgers finished the season with a 9-4 record, defeating UCF 45-24 in the St. Petersburg Bowl. Rutgers' streak of five consecutive bowl appearances ended in 2010, a year marred by a spinal cord injury suffered by defensive lineman Eric LeGrand in the sixth game of the season against Army. Rutgers lost its final six games that year, and finished with a record of 4-8. In 2011 Rutgers finished 9-4 with a postseason win defeating Iowa State in the Pinstripe Bowl by a score of 27-13.

After the 2011 season, Schiano left Rutgers less than a week before National Signing Day to become the head coach of the NFL's Tampa Bay Buccaneers. Schiano left Rutgers with a 68–67 overall record. Schiano finished 5-1 overall in the post season in 11 years at Rutgers.

Kyle Flood era (2012–2015)
Kyle Flood was promoted from offensive line coach and took over as head coach after Schiano's departure. He was the 29th head coach in Rutgers football history. In 2012, Rutgers began the season 7–0, including a 35–26 defeat of Arkansas on the road in Fayetteville. The team reached a No. 15 ranking in both the BCS and AP Polls, before a surprise homecoming loss to Kent State by a score of 35–23. Rutgers would go on to finish the regular season 9–3, including a heartbreaking 20–17 loss to Louisville in the last game of the season, in which the winner would clinch the conference's BCS Bowl berth. Rutgers suffered yet another bowl loss in the Russell Athletic Bowl, dropping an overtime decision to former Big East foe Virginia Tech by a score of 13–10. In November 2012, Rutgers was announced as a formal expansion acquisition of the Big Ten Conference, alongside rival Maryland of the ACC. Both Maryland and Rutgers were unanimously accepted to join the conference in all sports, effective July 1, 2014. Before this, however, Rutgers competed for one season in the American Athletic Conference, created from the remaining teams of the former Big East Conference.

Despite high expectations, Rutgers had an underwhelming 2013 season in the AAC, finishing 6-7 after losing the New Era Pinstripe Bowl to Notre Dame by a score of 29–16. 2014 marked Rutgers football's first official season of Big Ten play, with conference home games against Penn State, Michigan, Wisconsin, and Indiana, as well as road games against Ohio State, Nebraska, Michigan State, and Maryland. Rutgers finished the 2014 season in the Big Ten with a conference record of 3-5, including its first ever Big Ten Conference win over conference member Michigan, and an overall record of 7–5. Rutgers became bowl-eligible with that record and earned an invitation to play on December 26, 2014 in the 2014 Quick Lane Bowl, where it trounced North Carolina 40-21 and capped off its inaugural Big Ten season at 8–5. After the 2014 season, the Scarlet Knights were awarded their first ever Lambert-Meadowlands Trophy, being recognized as the top team in the eastern region. Looking to back up its strong showing in 2014 with another successful campaign in the Big Ten, the Scarlet Knights struggled mightily in 2015, beleaguered before the onset of the season by the arrest of multiple active players on assault-related charges. During the season, the Scarlet Knights failed to gain traction, finishing 4–8 with a 1–7 Big Ten Record. Amid the disappointment of a poor season and myriad off-the field issues, both head coach Kyle Flood and athletic director Julie Hermann were both fired on November 29, 2015.

Chris Ash era (2016–2019)
On December 7, 2015, Rutgers officially announced Ohio State defensive coordinator Chris Ash as the Scarlet Knights' new head football coach, becoming the 30th head coach in program history. Rutgers posted a 2-10 record in Ash's first season, in the 2016 campaign. In 2017, Rutgers started their first 4 games with only 1 win against Morgan State by the score of 65-0. They won their second game of the season in Illinois, for their first Big Ten win in 2 years. Rutgers finished 4–8 overall in Chris Ash second season as head coach. In 2018, Rutgers had a disappointing season, finishing 1–11 in Chris Ash third season as head coach. Rutgers won their home season opener against Texas State 35–7. Rutgers finished last in Big Ten play. Chris Ash, entering his fourth season as head coach, started the 2019 Rutgers football season with a win over the UMass Minutemen 48-21. On September 29, 2019 a day after a 52-0 loss to Michigan, Ash was fired as the Rutgers football head coach. Nunzio Campanile would replace him as interim head coach.
 Chris Ash had a dismal record in the four seasons he was with the Scarlet Knights, he finished 8-32 overall.

Greg Schiano era (2020–present)
On December 1, 2019, Rutgers and Greg Schiano agreed to an 8-year, $32 million contract that would see him return as the head coach of the Scarlet Knights. The 2020 season presented unforeseen challenges dealing with the coronavirus pandemic. Playing a Big Ten-only schedule, the Scarlet Knights were one of just two teams in the conference to play all nine of its scheduled games. Rutgers, despite missing spring and summer camp, matched the program high with three Big Ten victories, all away to equal the number of league road wins the previous six seasons combined. Rutgers finished the 2020 season 3-6 overall. The program also achieved academic success with 46 student-athletes recognized on the Fall Academic All-Big Ten list, the most for the Scarlet Knights since joining the conference. The team posted its highest GPA ever as a program during the spring 2020 semester. In 2021 Schiano's second season back as head coach and playing a full schedule, Rutgers went 5-7 overall, It was an improvement but also disappointing given that expectations were for bowl eligibility. However On December 23, the NCAA football oversight committee approved Rutgers as the first bowl alternate, under rules whereby five-win teams are ranked by Academic Progress Rate (APR) calculations. Rutgers finished first in APR among the five-win schools and was given the option to accept the bid. Rutgers accepted the bowl bid to play in the TaxSlayer Gator Bowl to play against Wake Forest with only a week of preparation for the game, the Scarlet Knights would go on to lose the game by a score of 38-10 to conclude 2021.

In 2022, Rutgers won their first three games of the season, then would go on to win only one game the rest of the season, winning against the Indiana Hoosiers for their only conference win, finishing the season with a disappointing 4-8 overall record.

Conference affiliations
 Middle States Intercollegiate Football League (1893–1894)
 Middle Three Conference (1946–1951)
 Middle Atlantic Conference (University Division) (1958–1961)
 Big East Conference (1991–2012)
 American Athletic Conference (2013) 
 Big Ten Conference (2014–present)

Championships

National championships
Rutgers has one national championship.

Conference championships
Rutgers has one conference championship.

† Co-champions

Bowl games
Rutgers has played in 11 bowl games. With a postseason record of 6-5.

Head coaches
There have been 29 head coaches of the Rutgers football team, 4 of whom have served in multiple tenures. Greg Schiano is the current  head coach, in his second tenure.

† Interim

Rivalries

Princeton
The rivalry dates back to the first college football game in history in 1869. The series between the schools ended in 1980.

Logos and uniforms

Traditional uniforms have featured red jerseys, white pants, and red helmets but the particular style has changed many times over the years. The helmets, in particular, have featured a wide range of logos. The Block R logo has seen various forms over the years but what fans now consider the "traditional" team logo debuted in 2001. Between 2012 and 2016, the uniform featured a distinctive chrome helmet with a rotation of red, black, and white jerseys that are based on the team's knight mascot. Rutgers returned to a more traditional uniform (red jerseys, white pants, and red helmets) in 2016.

Black jerseys have been rarely used by the team. Although black pants were worn on a couple of occasions with white jerseys on the road, the black jerseys (with black pants) have only been used eight times, in 2007, 2011, 2013, 2014, 2015, 2016, 2017, and 2018.

In 2019, Rutgers  sent a cease-and-desist letter about the Block R logo to Ruston High School in Ruston, Louisiana. The controversy was reported by national media outlets.

In September 2022, Rutgers unveiled new, white uniforms with red trim and matching white helmets at the season opener against Boston College.

Recognized players
Rutgers has had many key contributing players in its 153-year history of college football. Dating back to the 1910s, the university has had several All-American candidates as well as a couple of once potential Heisman Trophy candidates in its storied history.

1910s
Paul Robeson, born in Princeton, NJ played under future College Football Hall of Fame coach George Sanford. In his junior and senior years, playing as an end, Robeson was selected as an All-American in 1917 and 1918. After college, he played three years in the early NFL, first with the Akron Pros in 1921 and then the Milwaukee Badgers in 1922. Robeson was inducted into the College Football Hall of Fame as a player in 1995.

1920s
Homer Hazel first played for Rutgers in 1915, and then from 1923 to 1924. He was twice named an All-American, as an end in 1923 and a fullback in 1924. Hazel was elected to the College Football Hall of Fame as a player in 1951.

1950s
Bill Austin, a native of Fanwood, NJ was one of the first recognized players from Rutgers. Gifted with a twisting and elusive running style, Austin led the Scarlet Knights in rushing three straight seasons. Despite being undersized at 5'11 and 170 lbs, he rushed for 2,073 yards while ranking up 204 points in his career with Rutgers.  His 32-touchdown career ranks second in the Rutgers annals among all-time scorers and he also had a total of 13 interceptions from his defensive back position, which is one short of all-time mark.

Austin was inducted into the Rutgers Football Hall of Fame in 1988 and was recognized as an AP All-American in 1958. That year, Austin led the team to an 8–1 record, though the team could've gone 9-0 if Austin did not sit out the Quantico Marines game with an apparent hand injury. Austin was also considered a potential Heisman Trophy candidate, though the award was won by Pete Dawkins of Army that year. Austin went on to play for the Washington Redskins after being drafted in 1959.

1960s
By the 1960s, Alex Kroll came onto the scene as a formidable opponent. At 6'2 228 lbs playing center, Kroll played and was enrolled at Yale for two seasons before serving in the Army. He later formed a bond with the football captains at Rutgers before deciding to transfer there. Kroll was extremely physical in the trenches, giving way to his spot as the captain of the team in 1961. In his senior year biography, "his performance and leadership in 1960 helped Rutgers to a season which surpassed even the most optimistic of the previews. He has size, speed, hustle, and an uncanny ability to call defenses best equipped to stop the enemy." Kroll was an excellent student in the classroom, played linebacker at times, and helped lead Rutgers to a 17–1 record in his time at Rutgers, earning him AP All-American center award in the undefeated season of 1961.

1970s
The 1970s featured several great players for the Scarlet Knights. From 1971 to 1973, running back JJ Jennings tore up the record books, ranking him third all time at Rutgers with 2,935 yards rushing. He also led the nation in scoring during the 1973 season, with Honorable Mention on the list of the AP All-American team.

In the late 1970s, Rutgers football, led by coach Frank R. Burns, showed the nation its capabilities with an undefeated record in 1976 (11-0). That year included Rutgers star defensive tackle, Nate Toran, who finished his career with 52 sacks including 17 in 1976. Toran earned third team AP All-American that year and was joined by honorable mentions John Alexander, Jim Hughes, Henry Jenkins, and Mark Twitty.

1980s
An array of different players from the 1980s led Rutgers to match-ups against teams such as Penn State, Michigan State, Alabama, and more. During that time, Deron Cherry, a standout safety for Rutgers, was an honorable AP All-American in 1980, followed by his teammate quarterback Ed McMichael.

Other standouts included Jim Dumont Sr. and Tyronne Stowe, who holds the all-time record of 533 tackles. In the late 1980s, Scott Erney was an Honorable AP All-American mention, leading the team to key victories in 1988 over Michigan State and Penn State. Wide receiver Eric Young, who later went on to play baseball in the MLB, was another Honorable AP All-American mention.

1990s
The early 1990s brought in a great recruiting class for Rutgers football, featuring running backs Bruce Presley and Terrell Willis. Together they were known as "Thunder and Lightning," they racked up 5,889 yards combined earning Presley with second team Freshman All-American honors in 1992, and Willis with first team Freshman All-American honors in 1993.

In 1994, tight end Marco Battaglia came onto the scene as a force. In his career "on the banks," Marco went from 27 catches, to 58, to 69 catches in 1995. With great size at 6'3", 245 lbs, he was drafted in the second round of the 1996 NFL draft.

2000s
Running back Ray Rice is a player who has stood out as a major icon in Rutgers Football. Recruited out of New Rochelle HS in New York, Rice beat out four other running backs his freshman year to earn a starting spot in 2005. He racked up 1,120 yards that season. In 2006, Rice finished second in the nation in rushing and was a finalist for the Maxwell Award, given to the best player in the country. By 2007, Rutgers University had set up a Heisman campaign for Rice. By the end of his career, Ray had amassed 4,926 yards on the ground with 49 career rushing touchdowns and leads the Rutgers record book in almost every rushing category. He was second team AP All-American two years in a row ('06-'07).

Wide receiver Kenny Britt, defensive back Devin McCourty were both also Honorable Mentions on the AP All-American team.

Fullback Brian Leonard recruited out of Gouverneur New York HS, Leonard finished his Rutgers' career ranked fourth all-time in rushing yards with 2,775, fourth all-time in rushing touchdowns with 32, sixth all-time in receiving yards with 1,864, first all-time in receptions with 207, and tied for fourth all-time in receiving touchdowns with 13, second all-time in all-purpose yards with 4,639, and first all-time in total combined touchdowns with 45, and first all-time in career points scored with 272 total. He played for the Scarlet Knights from 2003 to 2006.

2010s
Defensive back Logan Ryan played for Rutgers from 2010 to 2012. He was a first team All-Big East and a standout player.

Quarterback Gary Nova recruited out of Don Bosco Prep HS in New Jersey, he played for Rutgers from 2011 to 2014. Nova holds several passing records at Rutgers, with 73 career touchdown passes, making him number one in that category in the programs history. He is also number two in passing yards with 9,258 placing him second behind Mike Teel who passed for 9,383 yards. Nova is also number one in attempts and number two in completions in his career at Rutgers. Nova was the teams MVP in the 2014 season.

Running back Isiah Pacheco recruited out of Vineland South HS in New Jersey, Pacheco finished his career ranked sixth in the Rutgers record book with 563 carries and seventh with 2,442 rushing yards with an overall total of 19 touchdowns. He also finished 11th in program history with 3,039 all-purpose yards. He is one of many great running backs in the programs history and the Rutgers record books.

Punter Adam Korsak out of Melbourne, Australia was a special teams weapon for Scarlet Knights. During his career at Rutgers, Korsak set many records. He is the NCAA all-time leader in punting yards with 15,318 and in attempts with 339 and also net punting yards in a season of (45.25 in 2021). He never had a punt blocked in his career at Rutgers. The greatest punter in Rutgers history was recognized as the best in the nation and was named the winner of the 2022 Ray Guy Award. It also marked a historic career for the most prolific punter in FBS history.

Retired numbers

Notes

Scarlet Knights in the NFL

The Scarlet Knights have had 3 players drafted in the first round of the NFL Draft. In 2010, Anthony Davis was selected 11th overall by the San Francisco 49ers, and Devin McCourty was chosen No. 27 overall by the New England Patriots and in 2009 Kenny Britt was chosen No. 30 overall by the Tennessee Titans. An Associated Press All-America selection, Britt became the first player in Rutgers history to be selected in the first round of the NFL Draft. 2010 also marked the fourth consecutive year that a Scarlet Knight has been taken on the draft's first day after Brian Leonard (2007) and Ray Rice (2008) were both second-round draft selections.  Bolstering the Rutgers presence in the NFL.

Current NFL players who played for Rutgers
As of March 11, 2023, there are a total of 12 Scarlet Knights listed on team rosters in the NFL.
  

Sebastian Joseph-Day – DT – L.A. Chargers
Tyler Kroft – TE – San Francisco 49ers
Isiah Pacheco – RB – Kansas City Chiefs
Duron Harmon – S – Las Vegas Raiders
Gus Edwards – RB – Baltimore Ravens
Michael Burton – FB – Denver Broncos
Clark Harris – LS – Cincinnati Bengals
Logan Ryan – CB – Tampa Bay Bucs
Bo Melton – WR – Green Bay Packers
Olakunle Fatukasi – LB – New England Patriots
Kemoko Turay – DE – San Francisco 49ers
Andrew DePaola – LS – Minnesota Vikings

Local media coverage
Rutgers has a contract with SportsNet New York to air various football-related programming during the season. Previous to its Big Ten membership (where its media rights are mainly a part of the Big Ten Network), this included games produced by ESPN Plus.

Football games air on the Rutgers Football Radio Network, which consists of three stations. The flagship is WFAN AM in New York, a 50,000 watt clear channel station that is also simulcast on the FM band. WFAN took over the flagship role from longtime home WOR in 2022. The other three stations in the network are WCTC, a low-power AM station that also carries Rutgers sports, WTMR, a Philadelphia area station, and WENJ, a South Jersey sports talk station. These games are produced by Nelligan Sports Marketing, a firm that finances college sports broadcasts throughout the nation.

Chris Carlin was the voice of Rutgers football, with Ray Lucas serving as his color analyst. Bruce Beck subs for Lucas when he isn't available. MSG Network reporter Anthony Fucilli works as the sideline reporter while WFAN radio host Marc Malusis is the studio host.

Inside Rutgers Football is the coach's show of Rutgers University's football team. The show, which debuted at the start of the 2001 season, is hosted by WNBC's Bruce Beck and features the Scarlet Knights' head football coach.

See also
 The First Game

Future non-conference opponents
Announced schedules as of May 4, 2022.

References

External links

 

 
American football teams established in 1869
1869 establishments in New Jersey